Margarites kophameli is a species of sea snail, a marine gastropod mollusk in the family Margaritidae.

Description
The height of the shell is 7.5 mm, its diameter 8.8 mm. The five whorls of the yellowish-white, umbilicated shell increase rapidly in size. They are flattened at the suture and then moderately curved. Only the body whorl is more curved and slightly wrinkled at the base and the funnel-shaped umbilicus. The sculpture consists of very fine, sharp lines of growth. They are crossed by very fine, spiral threads, which are separated by approximately equal intervals.

Distribution
This marine species occurs off Argentina.

References

External links
 To Antarctic Invertebrates
 To Encyclopedia of Life
 To USNM Invertebrate Zoology Mollusca Collection
 To World Register of Marine Species
 

kophameli
Gastropods described in 1905